Mälk is an Estonian surname. Notable people with the surname include:
 August Mälk (1900–1987), Estonian writer and politician. 
 Kadri Mälk (born 1958), Estonian artist and jewelry designer.
 Raul Mälk (born 1952), Estonian diplomat and a former Minister of Foreign Affairs of Estonia.

Estonian-language surnames